Stephan's emerald dove (Chalcophaps stephani) is a species of bird in the family Columbidae. It is found in Sulawesi, New Guinea and the Solomon Islands.

References

Stephan's emerald dove
Birds of Sulawesi
Birds of New Guinea
Birds of the Solomon Islands
Stephan's emerald dove
Taxonomy articles created by Polbot
Taxa named by Ludwig Reichenbach